Loshtar may refer to:
 Loshtar-e Gavaruyi